Elisabet Avramidou Granlund (born 1989/1990), known professionally as Elli AvrRam, is a Swedish-Greek actress and is now based in Mumbai, India. She is known for her Bollywood movie Kis Kisko Pyaar Karoon. AvrRam came to prominence after participating in the Indian reality TV show Bigg Boss in 2013. Elli along with Aamir Khan had a special appearance in the Koi Jaane Na film song "Har Funn Maula".

Early life 
Elli was born in Stockholm, Sweden. She grew up in Tyresö kommun, Stockholm. Her Greek father, Jannis Avramidis, is a musician who is now settled in Sweden; and her Swede mother, Maria Granlund, is an actress who had a part in Ingmar Bergman's Fanny and Alexander. AvrRam took an interest in figure skating, singing and dancing from her initial years. AvrRam received training in acting from her mother and aunt who runs a theater in Skåne County, Sweden. AvrRam felt a connection to India since her childhood. In an interview with the local Stockholm newspaper Mitt i, she said, "Even when I was five, I was fascinated by Indian dance and the colorful clothes." Since her father is a Greek musician, she found some Greek songs are related to Indian melodies. AvrRam dreamt of being a Bollywood actress since her adolescence. She would go to a video store in Stockholm that used to sell Hindi movies and she would buy Bollywood films from there. She also used to watch Hindi films on YouTube.

Career 
At 17, AvrRam became a member of the Stockholm-based Pardesi Dance Group, and gave dance performances, primarily on Bollywood songs.

AvrRam has done some acting projects in Sweden, the most noticeable of them is the December 2008 crime drama romance film, Förbjuden Frukt, where she played the role of Selen – the lead character's teen girlfriend. The film is set against the backdrop of violent crime, where she falls in love with a boy with a criminal past.

In 2010, AvrRam participated in Miss Greece beauty contest. She also appeared on the Swedish TV-show Gomorron Sverige.

In September 2012, AvrRam moved to Mumbai on a tourist visa to pursue an acting career in Bollywood. About the decision of acting in Hindi movies, she expressed in an interview with N Magazine, "[When] I was 14, I had a TV in my room and watched Devdas which is almost four hours long. I didn't move the entire time. I thought, 'Wow, I want to act and dance like that. I have to do Bollywood movies.'" She signed up with a modeling agency and soon got a work visa. The agency helped her getting auditions. The first considerable project she managed to get was a TV commercial for Eveready Industries India with the leading Indian actor Akshay Kumar. 

She eventually got her first major breakthrough by bagging a lead role in Saurabh Varma's comedy thriller film Mickey Virus. AvrRam recollected, "The photographer who took pictures of me knew a director who was looking for a girl for a lead role. I called him and had come to audition for his film." She disclosed, "Before I auditioned for Mickey Virus, I asked director to send me the script so I could memorize the words, because I didn't know Hindi yet. I was sent four pages of dialogue and there was no one who could tell me how to pronounce certain words. At the audition they liked my acting but the accent wasn't right." She was shortlisted along with 200 other hopefuls and managed to beat others. AvrRam revealed in an interview, "When I told the director that mom worked with Ingmar Bergman, he gave a strong reaction: 'What!? Has she worked with Bergman?' They were incredibly impressed." For her Bollywood launch, AvrRam has taken formal training in dance form and Hindi pronunciation. In this film she plays the role of Kamayani George, the love interest of the character Mickey Virus, played Manish Paul, who is a popular TV host and is making his debut in film industry. The film, shot in Delhi, released on 25 October 2013. 

The first Swedish actress to act in Bollywood, AvrRam has been noted for looks very similar to the actress Katrina Kaif.

In 2013, AvrRam participated as a contestant on an Indian reality TV show, Bigg Boss 7, where celebrities from various walks of life live together in a large house, completely cut off from the outside world. They try to avoid being evicted every week by public votes, with the aim of prize money at the end. The show, based on Dutch-based Endemol's Big Brother, went on air in September 2013 and is hosted by the actor Salman Khan. After spending ten weeks on the show, she got evicted in November 2013. AvrRam said in an interview with PTI, "I did not come to Bigg Boss for money or fame but with the agenda to have fun. This show has helped me become a household name. I am very humbled by the appreciation I have received from audiences and will cherish this experience for years to come."

In October 2013, colleges in Chandigarh reportedly banned the students from possessing or displaying posters of AvrRam in the campus and dormitories as the college authorities considered her images inappropriate.

In 2014, Elli appeared as a guest contestant in Colors TV's dance reality show Jhalak Dikhhla Jaa in its seventh season for the teen ka tadka special week along with Sophie Choudry.

In 2015, he third film, Kis Kisko Pyaar Karoon released in September. The film received good reviews and was a success at the box office. In 2017, she appeared in two films Naam Shabana and Poster Boys. She later presented the reality show The Great Indian Laughter Challenge.

In 2018, appeared in the film Baazaar in the song "Billionaire" along with Rohan Mehra and Saif Ali Khan. While the film faild at the box office, the song got good reviews.

AvrRam performed a dance act on the song "Chamma Chamma" for the film Fraud Saiyaan. The special song, was released in December 2018 by Tips Industries and gained over 15 million YouTube views in just three days of its release. Despite popularity of song, film was flopped in box-office At the song launch event, AvrRam said, "I signed up for this dance song because it's such an iconic thing to get to be part of the recreation of it." She appeared in another song "Zila Hilela" along with Sidharth Malhotra in Ekta Kapoor's movie Jabariya Jodi.

In March 2019, she appeared in a music video called, Haaye Oye, released by Sony Music India. In 2020, she acted in the film Malang playing the role of Jesse. In 2021, she made her Tamil debut with the film Naane Varuvean opposite National award winning superstar Dhanush. Her last special dance number "Har Funn Maula" with megastar Aamir Khan got more than 90 million views on YouTube .

Filmography

Films

Television

Web series

References

External links 
 
 
 

Living people
Year of birth missing (living people)
Actresses from Stockholm
Swedish people of Greek descent
Swedish expatriates in India
Actresses in Hindi cinema
Actresses in Telugu cinema
Actresses in Tamil cinema
Actresses in Kannada cinema
European actresses in India
Actresses of European descent in Indian films
Bigg Boss (Hindi TV series) contestants